The Sweden men's national squash team represents Sweden in international squash team competitions, and is governed by Svenska Squashförbundet.

Since 1976, Sweden has participated in three quarter finals of the World Squash Team Open.

Current team
 Christian Drakenberg
 Rasmus Hult
 Badr Abdel Aziz
 Daniel Forslund
 Joakim Karlsson

Results

World Team Squash Championships

European Squash Team Championships

See also 
 Swedish Squash Federation
 World Team Squash Championships

References

External links 
 Team Sweden

Squash teams
Men's national squash teams
Squash
Men's sport in Sweden
Squash in Sweden